Mikko Hauhia (born 3 September 1984) is a retired Finnish footballer.

References

External links

 Stats at Veikkausliiga.com

1984 births
Living people
Sportspeople from Lahti
Finnish footballers
Finland under-21 international footballers
Association football defenders
Veikkausliiga players
Danish 1st Division players
FC Lahti players
Helsingin Jalkapalloklubi players
Finnish expatriate footballers
Expatriate men's footballers in Denmark
Akademisk Boldklub players
Finnish expatriate sportspeople in Denmark